The Hon. William Frederick Ormond O'Callaghan (14 November 1852 – 20 April 1877) was an Irish Home Rule League politician.

Born in London, he was the second son of George O'Callaghan, 2nd Viscount Lismore and his wife, Mary Norbury.

He was educated at Eton.

He was elected one of two Member of Parliaments (MPs) for Tipperary in 1874, but died in 1877 before completing a full term.

He died at his home in London after a week's illness. He was buried at Kensal Green Cemetery.

References

External links
 

1852 births
1877 deaths
Home Rule League MPs
UK MPs 1874–1880
Members of the Parliament of the United Kingdom for County Tipperary constituencies (1801–1922)
Younger sons of viscounts
People educated at Eton College